Hypochalcia rayatella is a species of snout moth in the genus Hypochalcia. It was described by Hans Georg Amsel in 1959 and is known from Iraq.

References

Moths described in 1959
Phycitini